Jan Janovský (born 20 June 1985), is a Czech futsal player who plays for Rekord Bielsko-Biała and the Czech Republic national futsal team.

References

External links
UEFA profile

1985 births
Living people
Czech men's futsal players
People from Havířov
Sportspeople from the Moravian-Silesian Region